The Gombey is an iconic symbol of Bermuda, a unique performance art full of colorful and intricate masquerade, dance and drumming. This folk tradition reflects the island's blend of African, Caribbean and British cultures.

Dancers are usually male, and perform in groups of 10-30 though in modern times female groups have emerged. The traditions have been passed down orally from one generation to the next within families and the Captains of each troupe determine the direction of the troupe and style that is taught. Thus within troupes there can be found subtle but distinct differences in beats, dances, costumes, headdresses, by which they can each be recognized.

History
Historically, the Gombeys were not viewed as a respectable art form by the island's ruling class and were banned by the slave masters. Slaves were allowed to dance only once a year and did so in masks in order to protest, without fear of retribution, the injustices done them by their slave masters.

In an article from The Royal Gazette newspaper posted on January 10, 1831, a reward is being offered for the return of two slaves by the names of Ajax and Mentor who: "[w]ent off without a cause at Christmas, following that Idolatrous procession the Gumba. It is hoped that this late nuisance, the Gumba and other clamorous puppet shows of the Negroes, will meet the attention of all men of reflection that they be suppressed – as none but the worst or most ignorant Negroes follow such ridiculous shows."

Henceforth Gombey tradition is at its liveliest during the Christmas season, traditionally performed during Boxing Day, where the troupes would march the whole day around the island with crowds of followers. Also performances could be seen on Easter, New Year's Day, Bermuda Day and in modern times at soccer and cricket matches and other festivals and celebrations.

The word "Gombey" is related to the Bahamian "Goombay", a similar musical tradition. It also refers to a specific drum of African origin (see List of Caribbean drums). In addition to the Bahamian Goombay tradition, Gombey is similar to some other Afro-Caribbean styles and celebrations (such as the Mummers). In Bermuda, Gombeys are seen more as dancers than musicians, with ritualised costumes, accoutrements and steps, whereas in the West Indies the term applies to a musical tradition, not normally accompanied by dance. Afro-Caribbeans came to Bermuda primarily from former Spanish colonies as free, but indentured, servants in the Seventeenth Century ('til the terms of indenture were raised from seven to ninety-nine years as a discouragement). Most of these arrived as Spanish-speaking Catholics, but acculturated to become English-speaking Protestants. Smaller numbers of slaves, many of African birth, were also captured from the Spanish and Portuguese and sold in Bermuda, and smaller numbers deliberately imported. Few of the British West Indian traditions we know today had evolved at that point as most of the British West Indian islands postdate Bermuda's settlement, and most of the culture of the Afro-Hispanic and African immigrants of that century, like that of the Native American and Irish sent to Bermuda under similar conditions, has been lost. Over time, the blacks, Native Americans, Irish and some of the English merged to form a single demographic, originally referred to as "coloured" (leaving Bermuda divided into two subgroups, with those presumed to be of entirely European heritage defined as "white"). In addition to the bass, or "Mother" drum, typically home-made the modern Bermudian Gombey is distinguished by the use of the snare drum (generally in pairs), derived from the British use of the instrument. In addition, a kettle drum, a fife are integral parts of Gombey accompaniment; whistles are used by leaders to issue commands. The snare drummers play complicated riffs over the steady pulse of the mother drum, often employing call and response patterns, and striking the rim of the snare, as well as the skin. The result is an exhilarating, intoxicating, rhythmic mix which provides the impulse (or impetus) for both the dancers as well as the followers, with the snare drum patterns driving the body of the movement and the rimshots communicating with the dancer's feet.

Gombey's costumes cover their bodies from head to toe and are decorated with tassels, mirrors, bells, and other small items and symbols. The peacock feather headdresses, the painted masks, and the capes are distinguishing features of Gombey costumes. Many adornments of the costumes as worn today rely on modern materials or items, such as the Asian peacock feathers, that would have been hard or impossible to come by before the Twentieth Century, but there is little record of the original costume worn, so how it has changed since the Nineteenth Century can only be guessed at. There is a similarity to Native American Fancy dance costumes, which typically incorporate the feathers of native birds, so feathers less extravagant than those of the peacock may once have been a part. The Captains can be identified by their long capes and often carry a whip to control the troupe or an unruly crowd; The Bowman or Lead Indian carries a bow and arrow often going slightly ahead of the troupe to scout the way on long marches; and the Warriors carry a tomahawk (axe) which they place on their shoulder and use during cockfights when they face off against each other to display their expression of the dance. Freedom dance, junkanoo, cockfights, biblical stories, slow dance, fast dance, snake dance, and rushing back are all elements to watch for when observing a Gombey performance.

Although the Gombeys have enjoyed a remarkable shift in social status, going from a marginalized group to now appearing on postage stamps and performing overseas, there are still today old laws in place that prevent Gombeys from performing in the streets of Hamilton without permits.

Research and education
In February 2000, the Smithsonian Institution conducted training in folklife fieldwork for Bermuda-based researchers to prepare them to survey the cultural traditions of the island. Their fieldwork, conducted from April 2000 through March 2001, became the research basis for both the Folklife Festival, the development of the Bermuda Connections Cultural Resource Guide for Classrooms, and the development of a Bermuda Folklife Officer.

Dr. Richard Kurin writes in the foreword that "[t]his education kit grows out of Bermuda’s participation in the 2001 Smithsonian Folklife Festival. It is based on the important research that went into the Festival and the documentation that resulted from it." Included in this document is a chapter on Gombeys, Bands and Troubadours. Since 2010 the entire Bermuda Connections Resource Guide has been made available for download in the Folklife section of Bermuda's Department of Community and Cultural Affairs website.

Literature
Susette Harriet Lloyd (who travelled to Bermuda with the Church of England's Archdeacon of Bermuda Aubrey Spencer aboard  and remained in Bermuda for two years) published ‘’Sketches of Bermuda’’ (a collection of letters she had written en route to, and during her stay in, Bermuda, and dedicated to Archdeacon Spencer) in 1835, immediately following the 1834 abolition of slavery in Bermuda and the remainder of the British Empire (Bermuda elected to end slavery immediately, becoming the first colony to do so, though all other British colonies except for Antigua availed themselves of an allowance made by the Imperial government enabling them to phase slavery out gradually), writing of Gombeys:

One of the first major literary publications on the Gombeys was a book published in 1987 by Louise A. Jackson entitled The Bermuda Gombey: Bermuda's Unique Dance Heritage. It contains pictures and sketches of Gombeys, and outlines details of history, group roles, performance and costumes. Jackson subsequently also published another book, entitled Gombey Boy, and a short narrative film on VHS. More recently a children's book called Gombey Baby was written and illustrated by Bermudian J. K. Aspinall.

Film
In 2008 a feature-length documentary on the Gombeys was created by the Department of Community and Cultural Affairs, Bermuda. Entitled Behind the Mask: Bermuda Gombeys Past, Present, and Future, this film captures and documents the ongoing history of the Bermuda Gombeys, highlighting their importance as one of Bermuda's oldest Folklife traditions. It premiered at the Bermuda International Film Festival in March 2008.

Directed by Bermudian filmmaker Adrian Kawaley-Lathan, and co-produced with Bermudian filmmaker Kalilah Robinson, the film was created to supplement Bermuda's education system, providing much needed cultural education for adults and children alike, as well as an entertaining narrative that could be enjoyed by tourists as well as locals. Its narrative chapters were split into detailed sections covering every aspect of the Gombey culture and traditions. The DVD chapters are listed in the following order:
 History
 Modern Groups
 Essence of Gombey
 Growing up Gombey
 Performance - Drums
 Costumes
 Performance - Roles
 Training
 Performance - Dance
 Crowds
 Community Support
 Keeping the Tradition Alive
 What has Changed
 Unity
 Future

The documentary process consisted of over 30 hours of interviews and performance footage which have been preserved as digital cultural archives, in addition all the pre-existing data available on the Gombeys was amalgamated from private collections, the Bermuda Archives and Libraries into a singular resource. Primary interviews were conducted with: 
 Gombey historian and writer Louise A. Jackson
 Tradition bearer Gary Phillips
 Master Drummers Henry "Growther" Wilson and Jose "Boots" Herbert
 Carnival Gombey founder John "Pickles" Spence
 Costume Maker Janice Warner Tucker
And the captains of each of the Gombey Troupes operating in 2008 (alphabetically): 
 Shaun Caisey (H&H Gombeys)
 Kevin Fubler (K&K Gombeys)
 Andre Parsons (Roots Gombeys)
 Dennis Parsons & Andre Place (Place's Gombeys)
 George Richardson (Richardson Gombeys)
 Irwin Trott (Warwick Gombeys)
 Algina Warner (Alisa Kani Girl Gombeys)
 Allan Warner (Warner Gombeys).

While the historical data remains accurate, changes have occurred in the modern troupes since the documentary was created. It is expected that in the future additional documentaries will be made to supersede this one, maintaining historical records of the shifting culture in Bermuda over the years. The Department of Community and Cultural Affairs remains the best source for current contacts and information on the Gombeys. A Gombey Festival is held annually to provide continued exposure to the folk art traditions of this important cultural heritage.

See also
Culture of Bermuda
Music of Bermuda
Bermuda

External links
 Department of Community and Cultural Affairs, Bermuda - Official Website Department of Community and Cultural Affairs
 Bermuda Connections: Online Resource Guide - Free Cultural Resources on the community culture and history of Bermuda

Notes 

Afro-Bermudian
Afro-Caribbean culture
Bermudian culture
British culture
Dances of the Caribbean